Joshua Denver Harto (born January 9, 1979) is an American actor, television producer and writer.

Early life and education 
Harto was born in Huntington, West Virginia. He is a graduate of the Dreyfoos School of the Arts.

Career 
As an actor, he has guest starred in a number of notable television series, including American Dreams, Carnivàle, Crossing Jordan, JAG, Strangers with Candy, The Practice, Cold Case and more. He has also had brief recurring roles in the Nickelodeon series The Mystery Files of Shelby Woo and as Ben Sturky on the Disney Channel series That's So Raven.

He appeared in the 2001 film The Believer, alongside Ryan Gosling. He has a small role in The Dark Knight alongside Christian Bale and Heath Ledger playing character Coleman Reese, as well as the Marvel film Iron Man, both released in 2008. He also appeared in the 2010 film Unthinkable. In the same year, Harto along with his wife, Liz W. Garcia, created the TNT police drama Memphis Beat, starring Jason Lee. The series ended the following year after two seasons.

Filmography

Film

Television

References

External links

1979 births
Living people
20th-century American male actors
21st-century American male actors
Male actors from West Virginia
American male film actors
American male television actors
American television writers
American male television writers
Writers from Huntington, West Virginia
Television producers from West Virginia